Justus Kauppinen (born 28 April 1997) is a Finnish footballer who plays as a forward for the Xavier Musketeers as well as Ykkönen club JäPS.

International career
Kauppinen has represented Finland at under-15, under-18 and under-19 level.

References

1997 births
Living people
Finnish footballers
Association football forwards
FC Lahti players
FC Kiffen 08 players
Järvenpään Palloseura players
Finland youth international footballers
Ykkönen players
Kakkonen players
Virginia Tech Hokies men's soccer players
Xavier Musketeers men's soccer players
Finnish expatriate footballers
Expatriate soccer players in the United States
Finnish expatriate sportspeople in the United States
People from Mäntsälä
Sportspeople from Uusimaa